Kinesin family member 4A is a protein that in humans is encoded by the KIF4A gene.

Function 

Kinesins, such as KIF4A, are microtubule-based motor proteins that generate directional movement along microtubules. They are involved in many crucial cellular processes, including cell division.

Interactions 

KIF4A has been shown to interact with HMG20B and DNMT3B.

Clinical significance 
NTCP is the entry receptor for both Hepatitis B (HBV) and Hepatitis D viruses (HDV). KIF4 was found to play an essential role in HBV and HDV infection through its regulation of the retrograde transport of NTCP from the cytoplasm to the cell surface where it acts as a receptor for HBV/HDV infection.

References

Further reading

External links 
 

Human proteins
Human genes
Motor proteins